Juan Emilio Enriquez Ejercito (born March 27, 1990), professionally known as Jake Ejercito, is a Filipino actor and model. He is the son of former actor and Philippine President Joseph Estrada.

Education 

Ejercito attended Xavier School in San Juan from grade school to high school.

He studied politics at the Queen Mary University of London.

In 2018, Ejercito earned his master's degree in Marketing from Northumbria University in Singapore.

Career 

Ejercito made guest appearances as Jake, a classmate to Maine Mendoza's character Yaya Dub, in Eat Bulaga!'''s "Kalyeserye" segment in 2016. In the same year, he later appeared in the said variety show's Lenten specials and was awarded Best New Male TV Personality in the 30th PMPC Star Awards for Television for his appearance in the episode "God Gave Me You".

In 2020, he hosted Sunday Noontime Live! and made his film debut in Coming Home.

In September 2021-January 2022, he portrayed Cedric Banes in Marry Me, Marry You''.

Personal life 

Ejercito is one of three children of Joseph Estrada and Laarni Enriquez. He is a brother to Jerika Ejercito and Jacob Ejercito. Through his father, he has multiple half-siblings.

Ejercito has a daughter, Ellie (born November 2011), with actress Andi Eigenmann. He broke up with Eigenmann in 2014, but he continues to co-parent Ellie with her.

Filmography

Television

Film

Awards and nominations

Notes

References

External links 
 

Living people
Place of birth missing (living people)
1990 births
People from San Juan, Metro Manila
Filipino male film actors